Michael Kearney (born 1984) is a former American child prodigy.

Michael, Mick or Mike Kearney may also refer to:

Michael Kearney (politician) (1811–1885), Canadian politician and shipbuilder
Michael Kearney (Medal of Honor) (1874–1937), Irish-American soldier
Michael Kearney (priest) (1734–1814), Irish priest
Mike Kearney (born 1953), Scottish footballer
Michael Kearney, protagonist in the novel Light
Mick Kearney (born 1991), Irish rugby union player